Michael Eu (born 26 September 1946) is a Malaysian former swimmer. He competed in two events at the 1964 Summer Olympics.

References

1946 births
Living people
Malaysian male swimmers
Olympic swimmers of Malaysia
Swimmers at the 1964 Summer Olympics
Place of birth missing (living people)
Asian Games medalists in swimming
Asian Games bronze medalists for Singapore
Swimmers at the 1966 Asian Games
Medalists at the 1966 Asian Games
20th-century Malaysian people